Cheng'an is a county of southern Hebei province, China.

Administrative divisions
There are 4 towns and 5 townships under the county's administration.

Towns:
Cheng'an, Shangcheng, Zhanghedian, Lijiatuan

Townships:
Xinyi Township, Baisiying Township, Daodongbao Township, Beixiangyi Township, Changxiang Township

Climate

References

External links

County-level divisions of Hebei
Handan